Ploče is a town and seaport in the Dubrovnik-Neretva County of  Croatia.

Geography

Ploče is located on the Adriatic coast in Dalmatia just north of the Neretva Delta and is the natural seaside endpoint of most north-south routes through the central Dinaric Alps. This makes it the primary seaport used by Bosnia and Herzegovina and the endpoint of the Pan-European corridor 5C.

Čeveljuša is a toponym in Ploče, located to the east of the town, on the intersection of the D8 highway and the D425.

Climate 

History

The town was first mentioned in 1387 as Ploča. During the Kingdom of Yugoslavia, a port named Aleksandrovo after Alexander I of Yugoslavia was constructed in 1939. During the socialist Yugoslavia, between 1950 and 1954, and again from 1980 to 1990, Ploče was named Kardeljevo after the Yugoslav politician Edvard Kardelj. Some locals call their city Ploča (the stone).

Population
The total population of Ploče is 10,135 (2011), in the following settlements:

 Baćina, population 572
 Banja, population 173
 Komin, population 1,243
 Peračko Blato, population 288
 Plina Jezero, population 44
 Ploče, population 6,013
 Rogotin, population 665
 Staševica, population 902
 Šarić Struga, population 235

In the 2011 census, the majority of its citizens were Croats at 95.93%.

Port

The Port of Ploče was first mentioned on 6 November 1387, but the building of a larger port was done in recent modern times. Work on the present day harbour first began in 1939  but was destroyed during World War II. It was rebuilt in 1945 and the village of Ploče grew up to 480 inhabitants in 1948. After the Adriatic road and Neretva railway lines were built to the port in the mid-1960s, the town experienced a steady growth.

Bosnia and Croatia are currently in negotiations as regards the establishment of a "privileged economic zone" for Bosnian businesses within the Ploče port facilities, though this development is hindered by the opposition of local government, and Croatian people to the concept of a partial loss of sovereignty over the port. The Bosnian government would like a concession, with sovereignty features, for at least 99 years, whereas the Croatian government only wishes to offer commercial passage through Croatian territory for Bosnian and Herzegovinian goods. This topic was a subject of lengthy negotiations; easier passage for Croatian citizens through the narrow strip of Bosnia and Herzegovina territory (that divides Croatia's land territory) near Neum, in exchange for privileges for Bosnia and Herzegovina in Ploče. The Pelješac Bridge that bypasses Neum and Bosnian territory completely opened in 2022 although at first the project was strongly resisted by the Bosnian government.

Sister Cities

Twin towns – Sister cities
Ploče is twinned with:
 Ljubljana, Slovenia
 Rodi Garganico

References

External links

 

 
Cities and towns in Croatia
Port cities and towns of the Adriatic Sea
Populated places in Dubrovnik-Neretva County
Mediterranean port cities and towns in Croatia
Populated coastal places in Croatia
14th-century establishments in Croatia
1387 establishments in Europe